Bilkis (minor planet designation: 585 Bilkis) is a minor planet orbiting the Sun. It was discovered by German astronomer August Kopff in 1906 February and was given the Koran name for the Queen of Sheba. Photometric observations at the Palmer Divide Observatory in Colorado Springs, Colorado in 2006–7 were used to build a light curve for this object. The asteroid displayed a rotation period of 8.5742 ± 0.0005 hours and a brightness variation of 0.40 ± 0.02 in magnitude.

References

External links
 Lightcurve plot of 585 Bilkis, Palmer Divide Observatory, B. D. Warner (2001)
 Lightcurves 585 Bilkis, tripod.com
 Asteroid Lightcurve Database (LCDB), query form (info )
 Dictionary of Minor Planet Names, Google books
 Asteroids and comets rotation curves, CdR – Observatoire de Genève, Raoul Behrend
 Discovery Circumstances: Numbered Minor Planets (1)-(5000) – Minor Planet Center
 
 

Background asteroids
Bilkis
Bilkis
C-type asteroids (Tholen)
19060216